G. nana may refer to:
 Grallaricula nana, the slaty-crowned antpitta, a bird species
 Grevillea nana, C.A.Gardner, a flowering plant species 
 Grindelia nana, the Idaho gumplant or Idaho gumweed, a flowering plant species

See also
 Nana (disambiguation)